Rostislav Ordovsky-Tanaevsky Blanco (born 1958) is a Venezuelan-born  entrepreneur. President of Rostik Group and many other companies in Russia. 

Ordovsky was born in Caracas. His father emigrated from Russia after the February Revolution. He was raised in a multi-cultural home; his mother was Spanish and his father Russian. After graduating from Simon Bolivar University in 1984 with a degree in chemical engineering, he formed his company, Rostik International (now the parent company to all his other businesses) to import electronics, photo equipment, and media to Latin America in partnership with such corporations as Kodak and Disney. After helping to produce Russian-Venezuelan film festivals in Moscow and Tashkent, he expanded his business efforts to Russia and was soon operating some 500 Kodak one-hour photo stores. 

Rostislav Ordovsky-Tanaevsky Blanco is the first Russian businessman to be awarded Person of the Year annual national award in the field of business twice: in 2000 and in 2002. In 2004, Rostislav received the award of the Business People 2003 competition in the category Breakthrough of the Year.

In 2006, Rostislav won the semi-final of the most prestigious international contest – Entrepreneur of the Year (Ernst & Young). Rostislav will present Russia in Monte Carlo in the World final of this contest in June 2007.

See also 
 Nicholay Ordovsky-Tanaevsky - governor of Tobolsk guberniya (1915—1917)
 Rostik Group
 Rosinter Restaurants Holding
 ROSTIK’S-kfc - since 1993 (as ROSTIK’S), separated from Rosinter in 2006. Brands KFC and ROSTIK’S (since 2007) owned by Yum! Brands.

References 
 http://www.sras.org/news2.phtml?m=799
 http://corp.rosinter.com/about/leadership/
 http://www.passportmagazine.ru/article/273/

External links
 Top Management of Rostik Group
 book "Dream about Russia"

Living people
1958 births
People from Caracas
Venezuelan businesspeople
Russian businesspeople